Figure skating at the 2019 European Youth Olympic Winter Festival was held on 13 and 14 February at the Skenderija Hall in Sarajevo, Bosnia and Herzegovina. Medals were awarded in men's and ladies' singles. Eligible skaters must have been born between July 1, 2002 and June 30, 2004.

Competition schedule

Medal summary

Medalists

Medal table

Results

Boys

Girls

References

2019
European Youth Olympic Winter Festival
2019 European Youth Olympic Winter Festival events
International figure skating competitions hosted by Bosnia and Herzegovina